Oskar Böhme (February 24, 1870 – October 3, 1938) was a German composer and trumpeter.

Life 
Oskar Böhme, a son of Wilhelm Böhme, also a trumpeter, was born in Potschappel, a small town near Dresden, Germany, which is now part of Freital. For much of his early career, after studying trumpet and composition in the Leipzig Conservatory of Music until graduating in 1888, it is unknown what Böhme's musical activities were, though it is probable he concertized, playing in smaller orchestras around Germany. 

From 1894-1896 he played in the Budapest Opera Orchestra and then moved to St. Petersburg, Russia, in 1897. Böhme played cornet for 24 years in the Mariinsky Theatre, turned to teaching at a music school on Vasilievsky Island in St. Petersburg for nine further years, from 1921-1930, and then returned to opera with the Leningrad Drama Theatre until 1934. 

In 1934, however, the Great Terror began under Joseph Stalin and in 1936 a committee was established to oversee the arts in Soviet Russia. According to Russia's anti-foreign policies, Böhme was exiled to Orenburg on account of his German heritage. On October 3, 1938 he was sentenced to death and executed by shooting the same day.

Music 

Böhme composed 46 known works, of which his Trompetensextett in E-flat minor for brass sextet and Trumpet Concerto (Op. 18) are the best known. He wrote in the Romantic style, primarily works for trumpet and brass instruments in general. While, as a consequence of his exile, his works were neglected during the Stalinist era, Böhme is increasingly being rediscovered.

References 
 Biography of Böhme and his brother
 Details regarding Böhme's death (outdatd information)

External links

Notes 

1870 births
1938 deaths
Cornetists
German composers
German classical trumpeters
German emigrants to the Russian Empire
Male trumpeters
People from Freital
People from the Kingdom of Saxony
University of Music and Theatre Leipzig alumni
Great Purge victims